The following is a list of players and who appeared in at least one game for the Cleveland Spiders franchise of Major League Baseball from  through . This includes both the Cleveland Blues of the American Association and the Cleveland Spiders of the National League. Players in bold are in the Baseball Hall of Fame.



A
Gus Alberts
Myron Allen
Pete Allen 
Billy Alvord
Joe Ardner

B
Jersey Bakley
Frank Bates
Ed Beatin
Ira Belden
Ed Biecher
Harry Blake 
Frank Boyd
George Bristow
Charlie Brown 
Jimmy Burke 
Jesse Burkett

C
Scrappy Carroll
Kid Carsey
Elton Chamberlain
Cupid Childs
Henry Clarke
John Clarkson
Jack Clements
Harry Colliflower 
Bill Collins
Fred Cooke
Lou Criger
Lave Cross
Billy Crowell
George Cuppy

D
Vince Dailey
Hugh Daily
Joe Daly
George Davies
George Davis
Tom Delahanty
Bill Delaney
Jerry Denny
Fred Donovan
Tommy Dowd
Tom Dowse
Jack Doyle
Jim Duncan

E
Buck Ewing

F
Jay Faatz
Chauncey Fisher
Ed Flynn
Fred Frank
Chick Fraser

G
Bill Garfield
Dale Gear
Charlie Getzien
Bob Gilks
Jim Gilman
Mike Goodfellow
Ed Gremminger
Frank Griffith
Henry Gruber
Joe Gunson

H
Dick Harley
Jack Harper
Charlie Hastings
Emmet Heidrick
Charlie Hemphill
Ed Herr
Bill Hill
Mortimer Hogan
Pete Hotaling
Jim Hughey

J
Spud Johnson
Cowboy Jones

K
Ed Keas
George Kelb
Henry Killeen
John Kirby
Frank Knauss
Phil Knell
Charlie Knepper
Ed Knouff
Eddie Kolb
Otto Krueger

L
Ezra Lincoln
Harry Lochhead
Pat Lyons
John Lyston

M
Fred Mann
Harry Maupin
Jimmy McAleer
Sport McAllister
Pete McBride
Bill McClellan
Mike McDermott
Ed McFarland
Chippy McGarr
John McGlone
Deacon McGuire
Ed McKean
Mike Morrison
Tony Mullane
John Munyan

O
Doc Oberlander
Cinders O'Brien 
Jack O'Connor
Tom O'Meara

P
John Pappalau
Charlie Parsons
George Pechiney
Charlie Petty
Ollie Pickering
Jack Powell
George Proeser

Q
Joe Quinn

R
Paul Radford
Phil Reccius
Charlie Reipschlager
George Rettger

S
Jimmy Say
Frank Scheibeck
Jack Scheible
Crazy Schmit
Ossee Schreckengost
Ed Seward
John Shearon
Hank Simon
Will Smalley
Edgar Smith
Pop Snyder
Louis Sockalexis
Joe Sommer
Andy Sommers
Charlie Sprague
John Stafford
Bill Stemmyer
Jack Stivetts
Len Stockwell
Cub Stricker 
Willie Sudhoff
Joe Sugden
Marty Sullivan 
Mike Sullivan
Suter Sullivan
Sy Sutcliffe
Charlie Sweeney

T
George Tebeau
Patsy Tebeau
Pussy Tebeau
Tom Thomas
Jim Toy
Tommy Tucker
Larry Twitchell

V
Dick Van Zant
Peek-A-Boo Veach
Lee Viau 
Jake Virtue

W
Jack Wadsworth
Bobby Wallace
Buck West
Tom Williams
Highball Wilson
Zeke Wilson
Rasty Wright

Y
Cy Young

Z
Charlie Ziegler
Chief Zimmer

External links
Baseball Reference

Major League Baseball all-time rosters